Jean-Louis Bricout (born 27 December 1957) is a French politician who has served as Member of the National Assembly for Aisne's 3rd constituency since 2012. He is affiliated with the Socialist Party (PS) and previously worked as his predecessor Jean-Pierre Balligand's parliamentary assistant.

Biography 
Bricout was born on 27 December 1957 in Busigny, Nord, to a working-class family. He completed his higher education in Saint-Quentin, Aisne and then worked for France Telecom. In 2001, Bricout was elected as a municipal councillor of Bohain-en-Vermandois. He left France Telecom in 2006 to become parliamentary assistant to Jean-Pierre Balligand, the Member of the National Assembly for Aisne's 3rd constituency. During the 2008 French municipal elections, Bricout was elected mayor of Bohain-en-Vermandois. He additionally became a regional councillor of Picardie in 2010.

Balligand announced on 15 December 2011 that he would not seek re-election in the next legislative elections, prompting Bricout to declare his candidacy to succeed him on 2 January 2012. Initially, there was speculation in the local press that Jean-Jacques Thomas, the mayor of Hirson and general councillor, would also contest the Socialist nomination, but Thomas eventually announced on 14 January that he would not be a candidate. Bricout's campaign thus officially began on 10 February.

That May, Bricout announced that Michel Lefèvre, the mayor of Rougeries and general councillor of the canton of Sains-Richaumont, would be his designated substitute. However, Lefèvre died in a car accident on 1 June, less than one week before the first round of the election. Consequently, Bricout had to select a new substitute: Thierry Thomas, the mayor of Boué and general councillor of the canton of Nouvion-en-Thiérarche.

In the ensuing first round of the 2012 French legislative elections, Bricout received 41.1% of the vote against the Union for a Popular Movement (UMP)'s Frédéric Meura, who received 32.04%, and the Front National (FN)'s  Bertrand Dutheil de La Rochère, who received 16.3%. Bricout then won the second round with 54.30% of the vote, compared to Meura's 45.7%.

Bricout took office as a Member of the National Assembly on 20 June 2012, resigning from the regional council of Picardy due to the law on the accumulation of mandates.

On 23 March 2014, Bricout was re-elected as mayor of Bohain-en-Vermandois with 63.6% of the vote in the first round, against deputy mayor Sylvie Roy of the Miscellaneous left (DVG) and 21-year-old Ludovic Bersillion of the Miscellaneous right (DVG).

On 18 June 2017, Bricout was re-elected to the National Assembly with 60.45% of the vote against Paul-Henry Hansen-Catta of the FN, who obtained 39.55%. Due to the law on the accumulation of mandates, he resigned as mayor and was succeeded by Yann Rojo on 26 June 2017. Bricout subsequently resigned from Bohain-en-Vermandois' municipal council as well on 16 October 2017.

In May 2022, Bricout joined the Nouvelle Union Populaire écologique et sociale (NUPES), a coalition including the PS, for his re-election campaign in the 2022 French legislative election.

Elected offices

Bohain-en-Vermandois 

 3 March 2001 – 16 March 2008: Deputy mayor of Bohain-en-Vermandois
 17 March 2008 – 21 June 2017: Mayor of Bohain-en-Vermandois
 21 June 2017 – 16 October 2017: Municipal councillor of Bohain-en-Vermandois

Regional council of Picardy 

 22 March 2010 – 30 June 2012: Regional councillor

National Assembly 

 Since 20 June 2012: Member of the National Assembly for Aisne's 3rd constituency

See also
 2017 French legislative election

References

Living people
Deputies of the 14th National Assembly of the French Fifth Republic
Deputies of the 15th National Assembly of the French Fifth Republic
Socialist Party (France) politicians
Place of birth missing (living people)
1957 births
Deputies of the 16th National Assembly of the French Fifth Republic